Stephen Bryan Hill (born 12 November 1982 in Prescot, England) is an English professional footballer who played as a defender for Rochdale in the Football League.

References

External links

1982 births
Living people
Sportspeople from Prescot
English footballers
Association football defenders
Rochdale A.F.C. players
Morecambe F.C. players
Radcliffe F.C. players
Leigh Genesis F.C. players
English Football League players
Northern Premier League players